The Order of the African Star was established by Leopold II of Belgium on 30 December 1888, in his capacity as ruler of the Congo Free State, and was awarded for services to Congo and for the "promotion of African civilisation in general". It was incorporated into the Belgian honours system on 10 October 1908 following the annexation of the Congo Free State by Belgium. The motto of the Order is "Travail et progrès". The King of the Belgians is its Grand Master; although the Congo is no longer a Belgian colony, it is still considered to be a Belgian Order by tradition.

The Order of the African Star is theoretically awarded by royal decree with approval by the Council of Ministers. Following the independence of Congo in 1960, the Order of the African Star is no longer awarded, although it officially still exists.

Classes

The Order of the African Star is administered by the FPS Foreign Affairs and has five classes and three medals:
Grand Cross, which wears the badge on a sash on the right shoulder, plus the star on the left chest;
Grand Officer, which wears the badge on a necklet and a smaller star on the left chest;
Commander, which wears the badge on a necklet;
Officer, which wears the badge on a ribbon with rosette on the left chest;
Knight, which wears the badge on a ribbon on the left chest;
 Medals in Gold, Silver and Bronze on a ribbon on the left chest.

Notable recipients 

Grand Crosses
 Albert I of Belgium
 Albert II of Belgium
 Baudouin of Belgium
 Prince Charles, Count of Flanders
 Leopold II of Belgium
 Leopold III of Belgium
 Jan Smuts
Grand Officers
Commanders
Officers
Knights
 Paul Costermans
Gold Medals
Silver Medals
 Kristian Løken
Bronze Medals
Unknown Classes
 Yuri Gagarin
 Armand Huyghé

Insignia
The Badge of the order is a white enamelled five-pointed star with blue borders, surrounded by a crown of green enamelled palm leaves. The central disk shows a gold star on blue enamelled background surrounded by a gold ring displaying the motto of the order: Travail et Progrès (work and progress). The reverse is similar to the obverse but with a central disc of red enamel with a stylised 'double L' crowned Leopold II monogram superimposed. The whole badge is topped by a royal crown linked to the ribbon.

The Plaque is a 10-pointed star, with (for Grand Cross) alternating faceted golden points and rayed silver points, or (for Grand Officer) made of plain silver with alternating faceted points and rayed points. The central disc shows the obverse of the badge, including the surrounding green enamelled palm leaves, and in the top the 'double L' Leopold II monogram. The whole plaque is topped by a royal crown.

The Medal is round in gold, silver and bronze versions, with a suspension in the form of a royal crown with two pendelia and a ribbon ring. The obverse shows a finely ribbed central area with bead surround, with a star superimposed. The surrounding circlet carries the motto of the order: Travail et Progrès (work and progress) - the later issues are bilingual including the Dutch Arbeid en Vooruitgang in the lower half of the circlet. The reverse is a stylised 'double L' crowned Leopold II monogram within a palm wreath.

The Ribbon of the order is azure blue with a large central pale yellow stripe. When awarded in war time, the ribbon of the Order may be adorned with a silver of gold palm.

The Ribbon bar of the order is worn on the semi-formal dress uniform.

Award Conditions
The Order of the African Star was awarded for especially meritorious service of any field performed in the Belgian Congo and, "promotion of African civilisation in general". Its award was rare, and though on behalf of the King, it required the approval of the Council of Ministers.

See also
 Grand Masters : Leopold II - Albert I - Leopold III - Baudouin - Albert II
 Order of Leopold
 Royal Order of the Lion
 Order of the Crown
 Order of Leopold II
 List of civil awards and decorations
 List of Belgian military decorations

References
 Royal Decree of 26 March 1953 Creating Palms for the Order of the African Star and the Royal Order of the Lion when Awarded in War Time (Moniteur Belge of 14 April 1953)
 Borné A.C., Distinctions honorifiques de la Belgique, 1830-1985 (Bruxelles: 1985)
 Van Hoorebeke P., 175 Ans de l'Ordre de Léopold et les Ordres Nationaux Belges (MRA: 2007)

External links

 Order of the African Star at Medals of the World
  – alternate version of the above, with pictures

African Star, Order of the
Orders, decorations, and medals of Belgium
Colonial orders of chivalry
Awards established in 1888
1888 establishments in Belgium
Democratic Republic of the Congo awards
1888 establishments in the Congo Free State
1960 disestablishments in the Republic of the Congo (Léopoldville)
Awards disestablished in 1960